, other name Miyoshi Yukiyasu (三好 之康) or Miyoshi Jikkyu, second son of Miyoshi Motonaga, was a Japanese samurai of the Sengoku period, who served the Miyoshi clan.

His other brothers were Miyoshi Nagayoshi (first child), Atagi Fuyuyasu (third child), and Sogō Kazumasa (fourth child). His son was Miyoshi Nagaharu. He was also the castle lord in command of Shōzui Castle. Yoshitaka expelled Hosokawa Mochitaka and captured Shōzui Castle, which then became the main base of Miyoshi clan in Shikoku.

He was shot and killed during Kumeta war in 1562. He was one of the most important vassals of Nagayoshi as the power of the Miyoshi clan declined sharply after his death.

References

Samurai
1527 births
1562 deaths
Miyoshi clan
Japanese warriors killed in battle